Fang Weiyi (1585-1668, 方維儀), was a Chinese poet, calligrapher, painter and literature historian.

Biography
Fang Weiyi was the daughter of the landowner and aristocrat courtier Fang Dahzen (d. 1629). Her sister Fang Mengshi, and her female cousin Fang Weize, were also to be known as poets. She married Yao Sunqi (d. 1602) and had a daughter, but became a childless widow the year of her marriage. She returned to her family, where she assisted her sister-in-law to raise her nephew, the philosopher Fang Yizhi (d. 1671).

She was a skilled calligrapher, and known as a landscape painter.

As a poet, she described the contemporary political and social instability.

She published three anthologies in literature history focused in female writers. She also published a work about women's role in Confucianism. She and her sister was long referred to as ideal Confucian women role models by Confucians as well as themselves. This was however somewhat of a paradox, as the Confucian female ideal was a woman who did not, as them, participate in public debate, but restricted themselves to the domestic sphere.

References 

 Lily Xiao Hong Lee, Sue Wiles: Biographical Dictionary of Chinese Women, Volume II: Tang Through Ming 618 - 1644

1585 births
1668 deaths
Ming dynasty calligraphers
17th-century Chinese poets
17th-century Chinese women writers
Ming dynasty painters
Chinese Confucianists
Qing dynasty calligraphers
Ming dynasty poets
Qing dynasty poets
Qing dynasty painters
Ming dynasty historians
Qing dynasty historians
Women calligraphers
People from Tongcheng, Anhui
Artists from Anhui
Poets from Anhui
Historians from Anhui
16th-century Chinese women
16th-century Chinese people
17th-century Chinese women artists
17th-century Chinese calligraphers
16th-century Chinese calligraphers
17th-century Chinese historians